Älvkarleby Hydroelectric Power Plant is a hydroelectric power plant with 5 Francis turbines at Älvkarleby, Sweden. It was built in 1911. From 1988 to 1991 a new power plant with a single Francis turbine was added, increasing its generation power from 70 MW to 126 MW.

See also 

 List of hydroelectric power stations in Sweden

Hydroelectric power stations in Sweden
Vattenfall